The IKA Torino, later Renault Torino, is a mid-sized automobile made by Industrias Kaiser Argentina (IKA) under an agreement with American Motors Corporation (AMC) in 1966. The 1966 Torino was IKA's first national product. IKA was eventually bought out by Renault in 1975 to form Renault Argentina S.A.

The Torino was built on the same hybrid AMC platform through 1981 in both two-door hardtop and four-door sedan variants. It has been described as "Argentina's national car".

Background 
.  

In 1961, IKA (Industrias Kaiser Argentina) was looking for a car that could break into the Argentinian market, a car that could combine American reliability with European elegance. The automaker provided two 1965 Rambler Americans (a coupe hardtop and a sedan) to Pininfarina seeking styling updates. The new design largely maintained the general shape of the original Rambler with a completely new interior and facelifted "European" grille and rear end.

The car was presented on 30 November 1966, at the Autódromo Juan y Oscar Gálvez and was marketed as the quintessential Argentinian car. The Torino proved popular throughout the 1960s and the 1970s. It continued to be produced after IKA was bought out by Renault.

Renault continued the production until the early 1980s. In 1978 the Argentinian automobile market began to slow down considerably and this also coincided with the relaxation of trade restrictions and the introduction of foreign-made cars. The Torino was unable to compete with the newer cheaper, more reliable foreign models. Production of the Torino line ended in 1982.

A total of 99,792 two- and four-door IKA Torinos were built.

Engines 
All engines were manufactured in Argentina.

Tornado Special engine (only available on the 300/300S (4 doors)):
 Bore X Stroke: 84.94 mm x 87.31 mm
 Displacement: 2968 cc
 Top RPM: 5000 rpm
 Number of main bearings: 4

Tornado Interceptor engine. Available models: 380, 380W, TS, SE, GS200.
 Bore X Stroke: 84.94 mm X 111.125 mm
 Displacement: 3770 cc
 Top RPM: 5000 rpm
Number of main bearings: 4
 Power:

The Torino 233 engine features a new block and a new cylinder head. Available models: SE, GR, TS, TSX, GS, ZX.
 Bore X Stroke: 84.94 mm x 111.125 mm
 Displacement: 3770 cc
 Top RPM: 5200 rpm
 Number of main bearings: 7
 Power:
 GR (4-door)/TS:  at 4500 rpm and at 2500 rpm

The Tornado Interceptor 241 engine prepared for use in competition. Available in the Torino 380W TC.
 Bore X Stroke: 86.70 mm x 111.125 mm
 Displacement: 3950 cc
 Top RPM: 5400 rpm
 Number of main bearings: 4 

Racing 

A marketing effort was established by IKA, known as the "Argentine Mission of 1969" with coordination by engineer Oreste Berta and under the leadership of Juan Manuel Fangio because competing in auto racing was viewed as an investment in brand image.

The IKA Torino's most notable international success was in the Maraton de la Route race of 1969, with a Torino finishing in fourth place.

The cars were shipped three cars to Germany and given numbers 1, 2, and 3 due to Fangio's renown in Europe as well as a spcial classification due to the car's larger engine displacement.

After the three and a half days of racing, the No. 3 Torino that was driven by Eduardo Copello, Alberto Rodriguez Larreta, and Oscar Mauricio Franco, had covered the most laps of all – 334, but lost the top position because they accumulated various penalties during the race. The IKA Torino became "the pride and joy of Argentine car enthusiasts" when their country's team "showed that it could run with the best of Europe on Europe’s toughest circuit." This became "one of the great feats of Argentine motorsport having managed to gather the support of the entire national industry in a feat that showed the world the potential of this model built entirely in the country."

The No. 3 car is displayed in the Juan Manuel Fangio Museum located in Balcarce, Buenos Aires Province, the birthplace of Argentina's Fangio who dominated the first decade of Formula One racing. When not competing on race tracks, Fangio's daily diver was a 1970 IKA Torino 380S four-door sedan. The car was a gift after the 1969 Nürburgring 84-hour race and Fangio drove it until he became president of Mercedes-Benz Argentina in 1974. the car remained in Fangio's name until his death in 1995 and then kept within his family until 2013. The car was auctioned with no reserve at the Silverstone NEC Classic Motor Show Sale in Birmingham, England for £28,175, or about $45,000.

The IKA Torino won the Turismo Carretera, a popular touring car racing series in Argentina in 1967 with Eduardo Copello, 1969 with Gastón Perkins, 1970 and 1971 with Rubén Luis di Palma.

The Torino is still being raced, albeit in silhouette form with Jeep Cherokee engines, in the Argentinian Turismo Carretera and other series.

Legacy 
By the late 1970s, the Torino was the only non-Renault product manufactured by the French company. It could also be considered the last front-engine, rear-wheel drive Renault, a rarity in itself.

Many Argentines think of the Torino as the national car. Parts are still available and there are fan clubs.

The appeal of the IKA Torino to collectors outside of Argentina is limited because exporting one is difficult due to numerous registration and ownership regulations.

References

External links

 
 Production numbers on Coche Argentino
 IKA-Renault Torino specifications: versions & types on Automobile-Catalog.com

Torino
Cars of Argentina
Pininfarina
Cars introduced in 1966
1970s cars
1980s cars
Rear-wheel-drive vehicles
Mid-size cars
Coupés
Sedans